Black Roses (Swedish: Svarta rosor) is a 1945 Swedish drama film directed by Rune Carlsten and starring  Viveca Lindfors, Anders Ek and Ulf Palme.

Cast
 Viveca Lindfors as Märta Lind  
 Anders Ek  as Bert Thorell  
 Ulf Palme as Gunnar Bergström  
 Erik Strandell as Per Bergstrm  
 Gunnar Sjöberg  as Harald Vestermark  
 Karl-Magnus Thulstrup  as Hilding  
 Margareta Fahlén  as Margit  
 Tom Walter as Lars Persson  
 Åke Claesson  as Christian Lind, gardener 
 John Ekman as Afzelius 
 Eva Dahlbeck  as Per Bergström's wife  
 Harry Ahlin  as Chief constable  
 Axel Högel  as Herman - gardener  
 Kolbjörn Knudsen  as Dr. Wingård 
 Sven Lindberg as Swedish artist 
 Signe Lundberg-Settergren as Signe  
 Theodor Olsson as Klewens 
 Erik Rosén  as Chief physician  
 Tekla Sjöblom  as Miss Stendahl  
 Georg Skarstedt as Swedish artist  
 Albert Ståhl  as Clerk 
 Tord Stål as Dr. Granström  
 Ruth Weijden  as Miss Samuel

References

Bibliography 
 Alfred Krautz. International directory of cinematographers, set- and costume designers in film, Volume 5. Saur, 1986.

External links 
 

1945 films
Swedish drama films
1945 drama films
1940s Swedish-language films
Films directed by Rune Carlsten
Swedish black-and-white films
1940s Swedish films